Acronicta inclara, the unclear dagger moth, is a moth of the family Noctuidae. The species was first described by John Bernhardt Smith in 1900. It is found in north-eastern North America.

Subspecies
Acronicta inclara inclara
Acronicta inclara inconstans

References

External links

Acronicta
Moths of North America
Moths described in 1900